Allahabad-e Abu Saidi (also Romanized as Allāhābād-e Abū Sa‘īdī, and Allahābād-e Abū Sa‘īdī, Allah Abad Aboosa’idi, and Allahābād Abū Sa‘īdī; also known as Allāhābād) is a village in Esmaili Rural District, Esmaili District, Anbarabad County, Kerman Province, Iran. At the 2006 census, its population was 469, in 92 families.

References 

Populated places in Anbarabad County